Brian Crutcher (born 23 August 1934 in Poole, England) is a former international speedway rider who finished second at the 1954 Speedway World Championship finals.

Career
Crutcher made his debut for third division team the Poole Pirates in 1951 at age 16. He made his first World Final appearance in only his second year of racing in 1952, finishing in twelfth place. At the start of 1953 Crutcher moved to first division team the Wembley Lions and appeared in the next four World Championship finals, finishing second in 1954 behind Ronnie Moore. Wembley closed down in 1956 and Crutcher moved to the Southampton Saints until he retired from the sport in 1960.

World Final appearances
 1952 -  London, Wembley Stadium - 11th - 6pts
 1953 -  London, Wembley Stadium - 10th - 6pts
 1954 -  London, Wembley Stadium - Second - 13pts
 1955 -  London, Wembley Stadium - 5th - 10pts
 1956 -  London, Wembley Stadium - 8th - 9pts
 1958 -  London, Wembley Stadium - Reserve - did not ride
 1959 -  London, Wembley Stadium - 6th - 10pts

References

Living people
1934 births
British speedway riders
English motorcycle racers
Poole Pirates riders
Wembley Lions riders
Sportspeople from Poole
Southampton Saints riders